Mayo Hall, also known as Boys' Dormitory or Men's Dormitory, was a building in Commerce, Texas on the campus of Texas A&M University-Commerce that was built in 1936 with much of the $115,000 cost coming from the Public Works Administration. The hall housed seventy students and had a cafeteria and recreation room. The building was listed on the National Register of Historic Places in 2003 and removed seven years later. The hall was demolished in February 2008.

See also

National Register of Historic Places listings in Hunt County, Texas

References

University and college buildings on the National Register of Historic Places in Texas
Texas A&M University–Commerce
National Register of Historic Places in Hunt County, Texas
Former National Register of Historic Places in Texas